The Battle (French: La Bataille) is a 1923 French film directed by Sessue Hayakawa and Édouard-Émile Violet. Hayakawa and his wife Tsuru Aoki played lead roles in the film.

See also
 The Battle (1934)

References

External links 
 

1923 films
French silent feature films
French black-and-white films
1920s French films